Sharmila Tagore (also known as Begum Ayesha Sultana; born 8 December 1944) is an Indian actress, primarily known for her work in Hindi and Bengali cinema, Tagore is the recipient of two National Film Awards, a Filmfare Award, and the Filmfare Lifetime Achievement Award for her contributions to Hindi cinema. In 2013, the Government of India, honoured her with Padma Bhushan, India's third highest civilian honour for her contributions to the Indian culture through performing arts.

Born into the prominent Tagore family, one of the leading families of Calcutta and a key influence during the Bengali Renaissance, Tagore made her acting debut at age 14 with Satyajit Ray's acclaimed Bengali drama The World of Apu (1959). She went on to collaborate with Ray on numerous other films, including; Devi (1960), Nayak (1966), Aranyer Din Ratri (1970), and Seemabaddha (1971); thus, establishing herself as one of the most prominent figures in Bengali cinema.

Tagore's career further expanded when she ventured into Hindi films, making her debut with Shakti Samanta's romantic drama Kashmir Ki Kali (1964). She went on to establish herself as one of the leading actresses of Hindi cinema with films like; Waqt (1965), Anupama (1966), An Evening in Paris (1967), Aamne Saamne (1967), Satyakam (1969), Aradhana (1969), Safar (1970), Amar Prem (1972), Daag (1973), Avishkaar (1974), Mausam (1975), Chupke Chupke (1975), and Namkeen (1982). This was followed by a decade of intermittent film appearances including; Mira Nair's Mississippi Masala (1991), Goutam Ghose's  Abar Aranye (2002), and the Hindi films; Aashik Awara (1993), Mann (1999), Viruddh (2005), Eklavya: The Royal Guard (2006), and Break Ke Baad (2010). She made her film comeback after 12 years with Gulmohar (2023).

Apart from acting, Tagore has also served as the chairperson of the Central Board of Film Certification from October 2004 to March 2011. In December 2005, she was chosen as a UNICEF Goodwill Ambassador. She was married to cricketer Mansoor Ali Khan Pataudi with whom she had three children—actors Saif, and Soha, and jewellery designer Saba.

Early life 
Sharmila Tagore was born on 8 December 1944 in Cawnpore (now Kanpur), United Provinces to Gitindranath Tagore, a general manager in the British India Corporation, and his wife Ira Tagore (née Baruah). Tagore's father belonged to the aristocratic Bengali Hindu Tagore family, and were distantly related to the Nobel laureate Rabindranath Tagore, while her mother was of Assamese Hindu descent and hailed from the Barua family. Gitindranath was the grandson of the noted painter Gaganendranath Tagore, whose own father Gunendranath had been a first cousin of the laureate. In fact, Tagore is more closely related to Rabindranath Tagore through her mother: her maternal grandmother, Latika Barua (née Tagore), was the granddaughter of Rabindranath Tagore's brother, Dwijendranath Tagore. Tagore's maternal grandfather (husband of Latika Barua née Tagore) was Jnanadabhiram Barua, an Assamese who was the first principal of Earl Law College in Guwahati (now known as Government Law College), himself the son of the noted social worker Gunabhiram Barua. As a member of the Tagore family, she is also a distant relative of the actress Devika Rani and the painter Abanindranath Tagore (brother of Gaganendranath Tagore).

Tagore was the eldest of three children and had two younger sisters, the late Oindrila Kunda [Tinku Tagore] and Romila Sen [Chinky]. Oindrila was the first in the family to act in a film, and the only role she ever played was that of Mini, the child character (but a central character) in Tapan Sinha's film Kabuliwala (1957). In adulthood, she became an international bridge player. Her other sister, Romila Sen, married to Nikhil Sen, a businessman who served as chief operating officer of Britannia Industries for several years, died as the founder and managing director of Unibic Foods in November 2019.

Tagore attended St. John's Diocesan Girls' Higher Secondary School and Loreto Convent, Asansol. She made her film debut when she was a 13-year-old schoolgirl, after which her studies lost priority. Within a short while, her attendance and performance at school suffered, she came to be regarded as a bad influence on her classmates, and was faced with a choice of either doing films or studying further. At that point, her father advised her to move ahead in life, commit herself to a film career and 'give it her all' in order to become successful.

Career 

Tagore began her career as an actress in Satyajit Ray's 1959 Bengali film, Apur Sansar (The World of Apu), as the ill-fated bride of the title character. In 1959, Ray cast her in Devi, a film set in 1860 on Hindu orthodoxy and rational reforms. She considers it as her favourite film and performance.

She later appeared in Shakti Samanta's Kashmir Ki Kali in 1964. Samanta cast her in many more films, including An Evening in Paris (1967), in which she became the first Indian actress to appear in a bikini, which established Tagore as a sex symbol in Hindi films. She also posed in a bikini for the glossy Filmfare magazine in 1966. But, when she was the chairperson of the Central Board of Film Certification 36 years later, she expressed concerns about the increased use of bikinis in Indian films.

Samanta later teamed up Tagore with Rajesh Khanna for movies such as Aradhana (1969) and Amar Prem (1972). Other directors paired them together in Safar (1970), Daag (1973) and Maalik (1972). The Khanna-Tagore pair yielded 7 box office hits – Aradhana, Safar, Amar Prem, Chhoti Bahu, Daag, Raja Rani and Avishkaar. As per the review of the film Raja Rani made in 2014 by the Hindu newspaper, the film did well at the box office and taking into consideration, the inflation, as of 2014, the film would have grossed more than 1 billion. She had a successful pair with the legendary iconic Bengali actor Uttam Kumar. She starred in Gulzar's 1975 film, Mausam and won the National Film Award for Best Actress. She also played a supporting role in Mira Nair's 1991 film, Mississippi Masala. She had a very successful pairing opposite Dharmendra, along with whom she starred in seven movies – Devar (1966), Anupama (1966), Mere Hamdam Mere Dost (1968), Satyakam (1969), Yakeen (1969), Chupke Chupke (1975), Ek Mahal Ho Sapno Ka (1975) and Sunny (1984). Her filmography also include Faraar (1975) and Besharam (1978) opposite Amitabh Bachchan; Mausam (1975) opposite Sanjeev Kumar; and Bengali film Mangaldeep (1991) opposite Naseeruddin Shah.

Personal life 

Tagore converted to Islam, changed her name to Begum Ayesha Sultana and married Mansoor Ali Khan Pataudi, the titular Nawab of Pataudi and Bhopal, and former captain of the Indian cricket team, on 27 December 1968. They had three children: Saif Ali Khan (b. 1970), a Bollywood actor, Saba Ali Khan (b. 1976), a jewellery designer, and Soha Ali Khan (b. 1978), a Bollywood actress and TV personality. Mansoor Ali Khan Pataudi passed away at the age of 70, on 22 September 2011.

From 1991 to 2004, Saif was married to actress Amrita Singh. They had two children, daughter Sara Ali Khan (b. 1995), an actress, and son Ibrahim Ali Khan (b. 2001). His second marriage was to actress Kareena Kapoor in 2012 with whom he has two sons, Taimur Ali Khan (b. 2016) and Jahangir Ali Khan (b. 2021). Soha married actor Kunal Khemu in 2015, and has a daughter Inaaya Naumi Khemmu (b. 2017).

Filmography

Awards

Civilian Award 
 2013 – Padma Bhushan – India's third highest civilian honour from the Government of India.

Film awards

Other honours

Screen Awards
2002 – Lifetime Achievement Award

Anandalok Awards
2010 – Lifetime Achievement Award

International Indian Film Academy Awards
2011 – Lifetime Achievement Award

HELLO! Hall of Fame Award
2019 - Lifetime Achievement Award

Vogue Beauty Awards
2019 – Beauty Legend

See also 
 List of Indian film actresses

References

External links 

 

1944 births
Actresses in Bengali cinema
21st-century Indian actresses
Actresses in Hindi cinema
Actresses in Marathi cinema
Actresses in Malayalam cinema
Bengali actresses
Best Actress National Film Award winners
Best Supporting Actress National Film Award winners
Indian film actresses
Living people
Actresses from Hyderabad, India
Actresses from Mumbai
Recipients of the Padma Bhushan in arts
Sharmila
UNICEF Goodwill Ambassadors
Indian former Hindus
20th-century Indian actresses
Filmfare Awards winners
Filmfare Lifetime Achievement Award winners